All-Time Greatest Hits is a compilation of Barry White's songs, released in 1994. The album includes an essay by David Ritz. The compilation was rereleased in 2018 under the name Love's Theme : The Best of the 20th Century Records Singles in 2018 with replacing of Satin Soul by September When I First Met You and I Love to Sing the Songs I Sing at the end.

Track listing

Certifications

References

1994 greatest hits albums
Barry White albums
Mercury Records compilation albums
Universal Music Group compilation albums